Agne Hansson (born 1938) is a Swedish Centre Party politician, member of the Riksdag 1982–2006.

References

1938 births
Living people
Members of the Riksdag from the Centre Party (Sweden)
Members of the Riksdag 2002–2006
Members of the Riksdag 1998–2002
Members of the Riksdag 1982–1985
Members of the Riksdag 1985–1988
Members of the Riksdag 1988–1991
Members of the Riksdag 1991–1994
Members of the Riksdag 1994–1998